Shane Meier (born June 11, 1977) is a Canadian actor, best known for playing the title role in The Matthew Shepard Story, a TV film about the life and murder of Matthew Shepard.

Life and career 
Meier was born in Saskatoon, Saskatchewan, the son of Jane Weir and John Meier. He is represented in both Canada and the United States. He has appeared in more than 50 other films and television programs, including MacGyver; Walker, Texas Ranger; and Psych. In 2003, Meier won the Screen Idol Award for "Best Performance by an Actor in a Leading Role" for his portrayal of Matthew Shepard in The Matthew Shepard Story. Meier also runs and operates a men's clothing store called Goodlad Clothing in Vancouver, Canada. Goodlad was named after his great-grandfather James Goodlad. Goodlad sells premium denim and anything that goes with it. All goods that are ethically sourced from various parts of the world. 
Meier is also the founder and co-owner of Nobles Point Entertainment which he started with his younger brother Ashley Meier.

In animation, he voiced Willy DuWitt in Bucky O'Hare and the Toad Wars and Lancer in My Little Pony Tales as well as additional characters in Captain N: The Game Master.

Filmography

Film 
 My Life as a Babysitter (1990, TV Movie) as Ben
 Unforgiven (1992) as Will Munny Jr.
 Stay Tuned (1992) as Yogi Beer
 Impolite (1992) as Boy #2
 Needful Things (1993) as Brian Rusk
 Andre (1994) as Steve Whitney
 Man of the House (1995) as Big Kid At School No. 2
 Magic in the Water (1995) as Kid with Earrings (Uncredited)
 The Quest (1996) as 'Red'
 Warriors of Virtue (1997) as Toby (voice)
 Silver Wolf (1999, TV Movie) as Jesse McLean
 The Matthew Shepard Story (2001) as Matthew Shepard
 A Date with Darkness (2003, TV Movie) as Daniel
 Shred (2008) as Spinks
 Revenge of the Boarding School Dropouts (2009) as Spinks

Television 
 MacGyver (1990) as Boy / Young MacGyver 
 Mom P.I. (1990) as Ray Sullivan
 21 Jump Street (1990) as Ozzy Smith Fan
 Diagnosis: Murder (1992) as Paul McKinney
 The Ray Bradbury Theater (TV series) (Lets Play Poison) (1992) as Charles Scott Jones
 The Commish (1992–1995) as Mark Sullivan / Peter Brooks
 The Odyssey (1992) as Ling-Ling
 Madison (1993) as Paul Devries
 Lonesome Dove: The Series (1994) as Henry
 Road to Avonlea (1995) as Louie
 The Outer Limits (1995–1997) as Young Kevin / Mark
 Walker, Texas Ranger (1997–1998) as Tommy Malloy
 Beyond Belief: Fact or Fiction (1998) as Kid
 Sons of Thunder (1999) as Tommy Malloy
 Dead Man's Gun (1999) as Andy
 7th Heaven (1999) as Joe (3.21; 3.22)
 Stargate SG-1 (2000) as Garan
 Mysterious Ways (2000) as Mark Craven
 Call of the Wild (2000) as Miles Challenger
 Tru Calling (2003) as Sam
 The 4400 (2004) as Glen Keating
 Stargate Atlantis (2004) as Neleus
 Supernatural (2005) as Craig Thursten
 Saved (2006) as Tyler
 Psych (2006) as Kirk
 Intelligence (2006-2007) as Phil Coombs

Voice actor 
 The Ultimate Teacher (1988) as Additional Voices
 Camp Candy (1989) as Young Camper
 Captain N: The Game Master (1989) as Additional Voices
 Bucky O'Hare and the Toad Wars (1991) as Willy DuWitt
 My Little Pony Tales (1992) as Lancer
 Warriors of Virtue (1997) as Toby
 Stories From My Childhood (1998) as Miscellaneous Characters
 My Scene: Jammin' In Jamaica (2004) as Ellis
 My Scene: Masquerade Madness (2004) as Ellis
 My Scene Goes Hollywood: The Movie (2005) as Ellis

References

External links 
 

Canadian male child actors
Canadian male film actors
Canadian male television actors
Canadian male voice actors
Living people
Male actors from Saskatoon
Canadian impressionists (entertainers)
Comedians from Saskatchewan
1977 births